Hélder Tiago Pinto Moura Guedes (born 7 May 1987) is a Portuguese professional footballer who plays as a forward.

Club career

Penafiel
Born in Penafiel, Guedes played most of his career with hometown's F.C. Penafiel, mostly in the Segunda Liga. In 2008–09 he was loaned to F.C. Paços de Ferreira of the Primeira Liga, but his input during the season consisted of one match (30 minutes).

Guedes scored eight goals in 38 games in 2013–14, as Penafiel returned to the top division after a lengthy absence. He repeated the feat the following campaign (in seven appearances less), with the club being immediately relegated.

Rio Ave
On 29 June 2015, Guedes signed a three-year contract with Rio Ave FC. He scored on his competitive debut for his new team, coming on as a 70th-minute substitute in a 3–3 away draw against C.F. Os Belenenses on 15 August.

Guedes netted ten times in 2017–18, helping to a sixth-place finish and qualification for the second qualifying round of the UEFA Europa League.

Vitória Setúbal
Guedes joined Vitória F.C. on a two-year deal in the summer of 2019, after half a season in the UAE Pro-League with Al Dhafra FC.

Personal life
Guedes' father, José, was also a footballer and a forward. In an 11-year career, he amassed top-division totals of 63 matches and eight goals in representation of four teams. He died on 16 April 1997 (along with 12 others) at the age of 34 following an incident where the Meia Culpa night club was set on fire, the arson being orchestrated by the owner of a rival establishment.

References

External links

1987 births
Living people
People from Penafiel
Sportspeople from Porto District
Portuguese footballers
Association football forwards
Primeira Liga players
Liga Portugal 2 players
F.C. Penafiel players
F.C. Paços de Ferreira players
Rio Ave F.C. players
Vitória F.C. players
G.D. Chaves players
UAE Pro League players
Al Dhafra FC players
Portugal youth international footballers
Portugal under-21 international footballers
Portuguese expatriate footballers
Expatriate footballers in the United Arab Emirates
Portuguese expatriate sportspeople in the United Arab Emirates